Affliction is the first official full-length album by the industrial alternative rock band Econoline Crush. It was released in Canada in 1995 by EMI, and in the United States by Nettwerk Records in 1996.

Track listing

Personnel
 Dan Yaremko – bass
 Trevor Hurst – vocals
 Robbie Morfitt – guitar
 Gregg Leask – percussion & drums
 Rhys Fulber – keyboards & programming

References

1996 debut albums
Econoline Crush albums
EMI Records albums
Nettwerk Records albums
Albums produced by Rhys Fulber